South Glebe is a bus rapid transit station in Arlington, Virginia, located near the intersection of South Glebe Road and South Clark Place. It is a stop along the dedicated bus-only highway portion of the Metroway bus rapid transit line, providing two-way service along the route to southern Crystal City.

History 
South Glebe opened to the public as one of the original Metroway stations; the station opened for service on August 24, 2014. It was upgraded on April 17, 2016, to run in Arlington's new bus-only highway.

Station layout
Initially, the station was a sidewalk-level bus stop. It was upgraded to a side platform station, which opened on April 17, 2016.

References

External links
 Official Metroway site

Buildings and structures in Arlington, Virginia
Metroway
2014 establishments in Virginia
Transport infrastructure completed in 2014
Bus stations in Virginia
Crystal City, Arlington, Virginia